Autolite 2100 carburetors were made from 1953 to 1973. They are a synchronous two venturi (barrel) design, meaning both venturii operate together. There are eight different sizes ranging from 190 cfm to 424 cfm. They are available with manual, electric, or automatic hot-air chokes. They incorporate a feature called Annular Fuel Discharge, which greatly reduces the likely-hood of hesitation and flat spots under acceleration. They use the standard Holley bolt pattern (same as Holley two barrels). It was succeeded by the Motorcraft 2150 carburetor.

Size is determined by the diameter of the venturi. This can be found cast into the float chamber side. It will be a number in a circle, with the number being the venturi size in inches.

0.098 - 190 cfm, 1.01 - 240 cfm, 1.02 - 245 cfm, 1.08 - 287 cfm, 1.14 - 300 cfm, 1.21 - 351 cfm, 1.23 - 356 cfm, 1.33 - 424 cfm

References

Carburettors